Riverside Airport  was a privately owned, public use airport in Sedgwick County, Kansas, United States. It was located on the east side of the intersection of Hoover Rd. and 33rd Street North in northwest Wichita.

In late February 2014, the property was sold to Cornejo & Sons Construction, which closed the facility and plans to mine the sand underneath it.

Facilities and aircraft
Riverside Airport covered an area of 220 acres (89 ha) at an elevation of 1,335 feet (407 m) above mean sea level. It had one runway designated 16/34 with an asphalt surface measuring 3,200 by 40 feet (975 x 12 m).

For the 12-month period ending June 8, 2012, the airport had 14,000 general aviation aircraft operations, an average of 38 per day. At that time there were 29 aircraft based at this airport: 25 single-engine, 3 multi-engine, and 1 ultralight.

Nearby airports
Other airports in Wichita
 Wichita Dwight D. Eisenhower National Airport
 Colonel James Jabara Airport
 Beech Factory Airport
 Cessna Aircraft Field
 McConnell Air Force Base
 Westport Airport
Other airports in metro
 Augusta Municipal Airport
 Lloyd Stearman Field (Benton)
Other airports in region
 List of airports in Kansas
 List of airports in Oklahoma

References

External links
 Airport diagram and aerial photo from Kansas DOT
 Aerial image as of Match 1996 from USGS The National Map
 

Defunct airports in Kansas
Airports in Kansas
Transportation in Sedgwick County, Kansas
Buildings and structures in Sedgwick County, Kansas